Hang a Thousand trees with Ribbons is a 1996 historical novel by Ann Rinaldi.   The story, told in first-person narration, follows the life of Phillis Wheatley, the first  African-American poet. The story recounts her capture by black slavers in Africa and the horrors of the Middle Passage as experienced by a woman of intelligence and artistic ability when society assumed Africans were not endowed with either. Ann Rinaldi's vivid portrayal of the first African American poet is set against the backdrop of the American War of Independence, so there is a double theme of search for liberty in the novel.

1996 American novels
American historical novels
Novels about American slavery
Novels by Ann Rinaldi
Novels set in the 18th century